Are You Normal? is the second studio album by English rock band Ned's Atomic Dustbin, released on 3 November 1992 by Columbia Records. It features the band's biggest American hit "Not Sleeping Around", which hit the top of Billboards Modern Rock Tracks chart.

Music
Are You Normal? shows the band scaling back on the dual-bass, "punk-pop"-informed grebo sound of their debut album in order to "let the dynamics of the basses soak through the rush of power chords that dominate their early work." It also shows the band beginning to work with electronics, sampling and "ultramodern production" that the band would later continue to explore in their later work. AllMusic said the result is "an almost bouncy, bright album, full of great hooks and lyrical cleverness."

Track listing 
 "Suave And Suffocated"
 "Walking Through Syrup"
 "Legoland"
 "Swallowing Air"
 "Who Goes First?"
 "Tantrum"
 "Not Sleeping Around"
 "You Don't Want To Do That"
 "A Leg End in His Own Boots"
 "Two And Two Made Five"
 "Fracture"
 "Spring"
 "Intact"

Personnel 

 Matt Cheslin – bass
 Alex Griffin – bass, vocals
 Jonn Penney – vocals
 Rat – guitar, vocals
 Dan Warton – drums
 Andy Wallace – producer, mixing, engineer
 Steve Sisco – mixing assistant
 Darren Galer – assistant engineer
 Steve Gullick – photography, snaps
 Leigh Smiler – lyricist, lettering
 Helga – design

Charts

References 

Ned's Atomic Dustbin albums
1992 albums
Columbia Records albums
Albums produced by Andy Wallace (producer)